Norðurþing is a municipality located in northern Iceland. Norðurþing was formed in 2006 when the municipalities of Húsavík, Öxarfjörður, Raufarhöfn, and Kelduneshreppur were merged after special elections in January 2006 and the region was officially declared a new municipality on 10 June 2006.

The biggest town in the municipality is Húsavík, with a population of 2,307 inhabitants. Other settlements include Kópasker (population 122), Raufarhöfn (population 186), and Skinnastaður.

Húsavík is known as the whale watching capital of Europe   and is centrally located for visitors coming to the area who intend to visit Mývatn, Dettifoss, Goðafoss, or the Vatnajökull National Park.
Kópasker is home to the Earth Quake Center  and a local folk museum.

In Raufarhöfn, an attraction called the Arctic Henge is currently being built and is already attracting visitors.

Twin towns – sister cities

Norðurþing is twinned with:

 Aalborg, Denmark
 Eastport, United States
 Fredrikstad, Norway
 Fuglafjørður, Faroe Islands
 Karlskoga, Sweden
 Qeqertarsuaq, Greenland
 Riihimäki, Finland

References

External links 
Official website 

Municipalities of Iceland
Northeastern Region (Iceland)